The clamshell is a form factor of electronic devices such as a mobile phone, game console or portable computer. Clamshell devices are usually made of two sections connected by a hinge, each section containing either a flat panel display or an alphanumeric keyboard/keypad, which can fold into contact together like a bivalve shell. 

A clamshell mobile phone is sometimes also called a flip phone, especially if the hinge is on the short edge. If the hinge is on a long edge (e.g., Nokia Communicators), the device is more likely to be called just a "clamshell" rather than a flip phone.

Generally speaking, the interface components such as keys and display are kept inside the closed clamshell, protecting them from damage and unintentional use while also making the device shorter or narrower so it is easier to carry around. In many cases, opening the clamshell offers more surface area than when the device is closed, allowing interface components to be larger and easier to use than on devices which do not flip open. A disadvantage of the clamshell design is the connecting hinge, which is prone to fatigue or failure.

Etymology
The clamshell form factor is most closely associated with the cell phone market, as Motorola used to have a trademark on the term "flip phone", but the term "flip phone" has become genericized to be used more frequently than "clamshell" in colloquial speech.

History
A "flip phone" like communication device appears in chapter 3 of Armageddon 2419 A.D., a science fiction novella by Philip Francis Nowlan, which was first published in the August 1928 issue of the pulp magazine Amazing Stories: "Alan took a compact packet about six inches square from a holster attached to her belt and handed it to Wilma. So far as I could see, it had no special receiver for the ear. Wilma merely threw back a lid, as though she was opening a book, and began to talk. The voice that came back from the machine was as audible as her own." Also from science fiction, a 1964 episode of Star Trek featured an instrument called the "Communicator", which would become a regular plot device and an influence on future real-world technologies.

Early examples of the form factor's use in electronics include the 1963 Brionvega TS 502 radio, the Grillo telephone, which first appeared in Italy in the mid 1960s, and the Soundbook portable radio cassette player, which was introduced in 1974. The form factor was first used for a portable computer in 1982 by the laptop manufacturer GRiD (who had the patents on the idea at the time) for their Compass model. In 1983, the  laptop used a modern clamshell design.

The first Motorola model to support the clamshell design was the MicroTAC, created in 1989, although General Telephone & Electronics held the trademark from the 1970s for its Flip-Phone (one of the first small handheld electronic phones), until 1993. Flip phones became popular in the late 1990s and this factor lasted until the early 2010s. The clamshell form factor began to experience a decline in popularity in the late 2000s and early 2010s, due to the increasing popularity of touchscreen smartphones such as the iPhone, which use a slate-like form factor and large, non-folding screens. Clamshells remain a predominant form factor for feature phones—which remain popular among specialized audiences who prefer their simplicity or durability over smartphones. Samsung also released a low-end smartphone in South Korea known as the Galaxy Folder, which has a flip phone design and keypad reminiscent of feature phones whilst running Android.

In 2019, a new trend of foldable smartphones using rollable OLED displays began to emerge: the Samsung Galaxy Fold uses a clamshell form factor with a vertical fold and a small secondary screen on its cover, and exposing a larger, tablet-like screen when opened. Motorola unveiled a reimagining of the Motorola Razr in November 2019, which uses a foldable display and a clamshell design reminiscent of its namesake line of feature phones.

Automotive

In automotive design, a clamshell bonnet or clamshell hood is a design where the engine cover also incorporates all or part of one of the wings (fenders). It is sometimes found in a car with a separate chassis such as a Triumph Herald or in cars based on a spaceframe where the bodywork is lightweight and carries no significant loading, such as the Ford GT40 and Ferrari Enzo, where the whole rear end can be lifted to access the engine compartment and suspension system. It is also sometimes seen in unibody cars, albeit much more rarely - such as the BMW Minis and Alfa Romeo GTV.

It is also an informal name for General Motors full-size station wagons, manufactured from 1971 to 1976, that featured a complex, two-piece "disappearing" tailgate, officially known as the "Glide Away" tailgate.

Other uses
Besides smartphones, devices using the flip form include laptop computers, subnotebooks, the Game Boy Advance SP, Nintendo DS, and Nintendo 3DS, though these are less frequently described as "flip" or "clamshell" compared to smartphones.

Other appliances like pocket watches, waffle irons, sandwich toasters, krumkake irons, and the George Foreman Grill have long utilised a clamshell design.

Bookbinders build archival "clamshell" boxes called Solander cases, in which valuable books or loose papers can be protected from light and dust.

See also

"Communicator" (Star Trek), fictional forerunner of the "flip phone" (US, 1964)
Grillo telephone, early Italian "flip phone" (1965)
Brionvega, Italian company that introduced a number of products with "clamshell" formfactor in the 1960s and 1970s
Dual-touchscreen

References

Industrial design